Lee Chen-jan is a Taiwanese diplomat and politician. He was the Vice Minister of Foreign Affairs in the Executive Yuan in 2016–2018.

Education
Lee obtained his bachelor's degree from National Taiwan University in 1976 and master's degree from University of London in the United Kingdom in 1982.

References

Ambassadors of the Republic of China
Living people
Taiwanese Ministers of Foreign Affairs
Representatives of Taiwan to Sweden
Year of birth missing (living people)